National Highway 113 (NH 113) is a National Highway in North East India that connects Hawa Camp and Kibithu in Arunachal Pradesh. It is a secondary route of National Highway 13. NH-113 runs entirely in the state of Arunachal Pradesh in India. Kibithu is located on the last road head of extreme northeast of India.

Route
NH113 connects Hawacamp, Hayuliang, Hawai and Kibithu in the state of Arunachal Pradesh in India.

Junctions 

  Terminal near Hawacamp.

See also
 List of National Highways in India (by Highway Number)
 National Highways Development Project

References

External links 

 NH 113 on OpenStreetMap

National highways in India
National Highways in Arunachal Pradesh